Liliana García Sosa (born 17 October 1957) is an Uruguayan-Chilean actress with a distinguished film, theatre, and television career in Chile and Uruguay. She has been an honorary cultural associate of the Uruguayan embassy in Chile since the first government of Tabaré Vázquez.

Biography

Simultaneously, she studied law at the University of the Republic, where she advocated, as a student leader, the conquest of co-government and the autonomy of the University. She also developed an important presence as a trade union leader in the Uruguayan Society of Actors. Once in Chile, she continued her union work (SIDARTE) and was part of the creation of the Chileactores management company, of which she was a board member for nine years.

She joined the stable cast of the Teatro Circular de Montevideo from 1977 to 1987.

She has worked with prestigious directors of the Uruguayan scene, including Júver Salcedo, Héctor Manuel Vidal, Santiago Introini, Dervy Vilas, and Jorge Curi. In Uruguay, in 2012, she worked under the direction of Sebastián Barrios.

In 1987, the year in which García moved to Chile, she continued her theatrical activity (in Chile she has performed in plays under the direction of Delfina Guzmán, Pete Brooks, Liliana Ross, Mateo Iribarren, Cristián Campos, and Rodrigo Muñoz, among others) and began to develop a prominent television and film career. The latter was born in Uruguay, where she participated in short films of the Cinemateca Uruguaya, with directors such as Juan Carlos Rodríguez Castro. In Chile she appeared in a dozen films, directed by Raúl Ruiz (France), Gonzalo Justiniano (Chile), Esteban Schroeder (Uruguay),  (Germany), Sebastián Lelio (Chile), and others. In television, she worked on more than 50 fiction productions between 1988 and 2012, on Chilean channels 7, 9, 11, and 13.

In 1989, she recorded the nationally and internationally awarded play  for an Ibero-American theatre cycle on Televisión Española (TVE).

García has appeared in a score of theatrical titles, many of them with long seasons and international tours, as happened with Doña Ramona, directed by Jorge Curi, with seasons in Spain and Argentina. This was also the case with the play Sangre, directed by Pete Brooks, which was a month at the Young Vic Theater in London; it also toured much of England and Scotland.

Since 2002, she has given workshops and seminars as a teacher and as a rapporteur. At the University of Arts, Sciences, and Communications (UNIACC), she has taught in the fields of Baccalaureate of Cinema and Television, Audiovisual School, and in the School of Theater and Scenic Communication. At the same university, she gave workshops for graduates of different disciplines.

Due to her proven and committed career, in 2008 Uruguayan President Tabaré Vázquez appointed her honorary cultural attaché of the Uruguayan embassy in Chile, a position she continues to hold. In 2009, the Official Service of Broadcasting, Television, and Entertainment (SODRE) honoured her by exhibiting her portrait in the third edition of the photographic exhibition Mujeres Uruguayas 3, which paid tribute to women from Uruguay who have been recognized in very different areas of national work.

It had a new run at the GAM in August 2015, after showing at the Solís Theatre in Montevideo that April.

Formal education
García studied at the School of Dramatic Art of the El Galpón Theater Institution from 1974 to 1976. She began her professional development as an actress in 1976, being a student of dramatic art.

She graduated from the School of Dramatic Art of the Teatro Circular de Montevideo with subsequent specialization of the teaching of scenic art (1977–1981).

She studied at the Faculty of Law and Social Sciences, University of the Oriental Republic of Uruguay. One year before finishing her law degree, she left the university for her transfer to Chile.

Filmography

Television

Telenovelas

Series

Theater
 1976–1977, Teatro Popular Español by Federico García Lorca, Ramón del Valle-Inclán, Rafael Alberti, singer Anónimo Español; Teatro Rioplatense by Florencio Sánchez, Roberto Cossa, Jacobo Lagsner, Juan Graña, and Alberto Paredes (both shows directed by Roberto Fontana)
 1978, Juegos a la hora de la siesta by Roma Mahieu (director Carlos Aguilera)
 1979, Richard III by William Shakespeare (director Héctor Manuel Vidal)
 1979, The Cherry Orchard by Anton Chekhov (director Dervy Vilas)
 1979/1980 La trastienda by Carlos Maggi (director Júver Salcedo)
 1980/1981, Mariana Pineda by Federico García Lorca (director Jorge Curi)
 1982,  by Víctor Manuel Leites (director Jorge Curi)
 1983, Los engañados by Lope de Rueda (director Santiago Introini)
 1983, La rebelión de las mujeres, based on Lysistrata by Aristophanes, by Mercedes Rein and Jorge Curi (director Jorge Curi)
 1983, Vivir para atrás by Juan Graña (director Juan Graña)
 1985, Las Raíces by Milton Schinca (director Santiago Introini)
 1986, Doña Ramona by Víctor Manuel Leites (director Jorge Curi). Presentation in the main cities of Spain. Ibero-American Festival of Huelva Award for the Best Show. Presented as the opening work of the first edition of the Theater Festival of Cádiz, Spain.
 1990, Taxi by Ray Cooney (director Cristián Campos)
 1993, Albertina en cinco tiempos by Michael Tremblay (director Delfina Guzmán)
 1994, Taxi by Ray Cooney, re-release (director Cristián Campos)
 1995, Sangre Creación Colectiva (director Pete Brooks)
 1996, Sangre, re-release at the Young Vic Theater in London
 2001, The Vagina Monologues by Eve Ensler (director Liliana Ross)
 2002, Yo soy tú by Alex Jones (director Liliana Ross)
 2006, Kuarteto by Santiago Moncada (adapted and directed by Tomás Vidiella)
 2007, The House of Bernarda Alba by Federico García Lorca (director Tomás Vidiella)
 2008, Cristal tu corazón by Pedro Lemebel (director Rodrigo Muñoz)
 2008,  by Jordi Galceran (director Liliana Ross)
 2009, Brujas by Santiago Moncada (new season under the direction of Mateo Iribarren) 
 2012, En honor al mérito (La investigación saboteada) by Margarita Musto (director Sebastián Barrios)  

Union activity and cultural management
 1977/1987, Member of the board of directors of the Uruguayan Society of Actors (SUA) and the Uruguayan Federation of Independent Theaters (FUTI); participated in the activity of the Latin American Actors Block (BLADA) and the International Federation of Actors (FIA)
 2006, "Operational Training Leader of DHL Latam" (international seminar)
 2007, Friedrich Ebert Foundation: developed a workshop for political leaders pertaining to the youth of the different parties of the agreement
 2007, School of Theater and Scenic Communication, University of Arts, Sciences, and Communications (UNIACC)
 2007/2008, Workshops for graduates of different disciplines, preparation for "presenting themselves in front of the public", UNIACC
 2008, Bachelor of Film and Television, Audiovisual School, UNIACC: Teaching
 2008, School of Theater and Scenic Communication, UNIACC: Teaching
 2009, Institutional video recording, Friedrich Ebert
 2009, Banco del Estado de Chile Computer Area
 2009/2010, Director of the board of directors of Chileactores
 2010, Leadership course for the directors of Intercoiffeur Chile

References

External links

1957 births
20th-century Chilean actresses
20th-century Uruguayan actresses
21st-century Chilean actresses
21st-century Uruguayan actresses
Actresses from Montevideo
Chilean film actresses
Chilean stage actresses
Chilean telenovela actresses
Living people
Uruguayan expatriates in Chile
Uruguayan female models
Uruguayan film actresses
Uruguayan stage actresses